Martin Goldstern (born 7 May 1963 in Austria) is an Austrian mathematician and university professor for set theory at the TU Wien and head of the research unit 1 of the Institute of Discrete Mathematics and Geometry.
His main research lies in set theory of the real line and forcing theory, and applications of set theory in universal algebra.

He is cousin of Martin Karplus and great-nephew of Eugenie Goldstern.

Academic career
Goldstern earned a Ph.D. in 1986  at the TU Wien under the direction of Robert F. Tichy, with a dissertation in equidistribution; and another in set theory in 1991 at UC Berkeley under the direction of Jack Silver and Haim Judah. As postdoc he held temporary positions at Bar Ilan University, Freie Universität Berlin and Carnegie Mellon University. He acquired habilitation at TU Wien in 1993 with the thesis 
Tools for your forcing construction, which greatly simplified, and made widely accessible, a general preservation theorem of Saharon Shelah for countable support proper forcing iterations. 
In 1993 he started working at TU Wien, where he is now full professor.

1996 he won the Prize of the Austrian Mathematical Society.
2015 and 2018 he held visiting professor positions at the Hebrew University of Jerusalem.
Together with Jakob Kellner and Shelah he showed the consistency (assuming large cardinals) of Cichoń's maximum, i.e., the statement that the ten "independent" entries in Cichoń's diagram are all different.

Selected publications
 
 
   (reprinted in 1998)

References

External links
 Goldstern's web page at TU Wien
 

Austrian logicians
20th-century Austrian mathematicians
21st-century Austrian mathematicians
Set theorists
1963 births
University of California, Berkeley alumni
Living people
Academic staff of TU Wien